Prachuap Khiri Khan Province Stadium (known as Sam Ao Stadium) is a multi-purpose stadium in Prachuap Khiri Khan Province, Thailand. It is currently used mostly for football matches and is the home stadium of Prachuap F.C.  The stadium holds 5,000 people.

Name

The Stadium is named after the famous seascape of district, with Prachuap Bay, Manao Bay, and Noii Bay. Three bay in Thai language pronounce as "Sam Ao".

Gallery

References

Football venues in Thailand